Mallapuram is a village in the Kumbakonam taluk of Thanjavur district, Tamil Nadu, India.

Demographics 

As per the 2001 census, Mallapuram had a total population of 1469 with 737 males and 732 females. The sex ratio was 993. The literacy rate was 79.31.

See also
 B. Mallapuram - alternative name for Bommidi in Tamil Nadu

References 

 

Villages in Thanjavur district